L'Isle-Adam may refer to:

Places
 L'Isle-Adam, Val-d'Oise, a commune in France
 Château de L'Isle-Adam

People
 Philippe Villiers de L'Isle-Adam (1464-1534), Grand Master of the Knights Hospitaller
 Auguste Villiers de l'Isle-Adam (1838–1889), French symbolist writer